Peavine Creek is a stream in Catoosa County and Walker County, Georgia, United States. It is a tributary of Chickamauga Creek.

Peavine Creek was named from the fact wild pea vines are native to the region.

See also
List of rivers of Georgia (U.S. state)

References

Rivers of Catoosa County, Georgia
Rivers of Walker County, Georgia
Rivers of Georgia (U.S. state)